Taitano is a surname. Notable people with the surname include:

Jesse Taitano, Guam mixed martial artist
Leevin Taitano Camacho (born 1977/78), Guam lawyer
Lehua Taitano (born 1978), Chamoru poet, interdisciplinary artist, and educator
Ricardo Taitano (born 1957), Guam long-distance runner